Mohamed Ghalayini (born February 15, 1966) is an American film and television actor, known by his stage name Mo Gallini.

Biography
Gallini was born Mohamed Ghalayini on February 15, 1966, in Miami, Florida. His father was from Lebanon, and his mother was of Cuban descent. He attended the University of Florida from 1983 to 1985 before moving to Los Angeles with his family. After moving, Gallini met director David Anspaugh, who offered him his first role as a Notre Dame football player in the 1993 film Rudy. Gallini has portrayed over fifty characters in television and film, including the roles of Enrique in 2 Fast 2 Furious (as "Matt Gallini"), Abdul Manesh on the fourth season of the hit series 24, and Interrogator in Seal Team Six: The Raid on Osama Bin Laden. He was awarded Best Supporting Actor honors at the 2008 BendFilm Festival for his portrayal of identity thief Wesley Stone in Selfless. Gallini appeared in the recurring role of firefighter Jose Vargas in season 1 of the NBC television series Chicago Fire.

Filmography

References

External links
 Official website
 

1966 births
American male television actors
American people of Cuban descent
American people of Lebanese descent
Living people
Male actors from Miami